In enzymology, a [isocitrate dehydrogenase (NADP+)] kinase is an enzyme that catalyzes the chemical reaction:
ATP + [isocitrate dehydrogenase (NADP+)]  ADP + [isocitrate dehydrogenase (NADP+)] phosphate

Thus, the two substrates of this enzyme are ATP and isocitrate dehydrogenase (NADP+), whereas its two products are ADP and isocitrate dehydrogenase (NADP+) phosphate.

This enzyme belongs to the family of transferases, specifically those transferring a phosphate group to the sidechain oxygen atom of serine or threonine residues in proteins (protein-serine/threonine kinases).

Other names
The systematic name of this enzyme class is ATP:[isocitrate dehydrogenase (NADP+)] phosphotransferase. Other names in common use include [isocitrate dehydrogenase (NADP+)] kinase, ICDH kinase/phosphatase, IDH kinase, IDH kinase/phosphatase, IDH-K/P, IDHK/P, isocitrate dehydrogenase kinase (phosphorylating), isocitrate dehydrogenase kinase/phosphatase, and STK3.

References
 
 
 
 

EC 2.7.11
Enzymes of unknown structure